Red Bank is a city in Hamilton County, Tennessee, United States. The population was 11,899 at the 2020 census . Red Bank is an enclave, being entirely surrounded by the city limits of Chattanooga. Red Bank is part of the Chattanooga, TN-GA, Metropolitan Statistical Area.

History

Red Bank was originally known as "Pleasant Hill". When a post office was established in the community in 1881, however, it was asked to adopt a new name, since the name "Pleasant Hill" was already taken. The name "Red Bank" was chosen by the wife of the first postmaster, George Hartman. It was inspired by the red clay ridge that was visible from a window in her house. In 1955, the communities of Red Bank and White Oak incorporated as a single town called "Red Bank-White Oak". In 1966, the city voted to drop the "White Oak" for simplification purposes.

Geography
Red Bank is located at  (35.110372, -85.297048). The city lies at the base of the Cumberland Plateau in southwestern Hamilton County. Dayton Boulevard is the city's main thoroughfare, though U.S. Route 27 runs along the city's western edge.

The city center follows the valley of Stringers Branch, a southwest-flowing tributary of the Tennessee River.

Demographics

2020 census

As of the 2020 United States census, there were 11,899 people, 5,683 households, and 2,667 families residing in the city.

2000 census
As of the census of 2000, there were 12,418 people, 5,897 households, and 3,290 families residing in the city. The population density was 1,927.9 people per square mile (744.5/km2). There were 6,443 housing units at an average density of 1,000.3 per square mile (386.3/km2). The racial makeup of the city was 87.61% White, 8.24% African American, 0.52% Native American, 0.89% Asian, 0.06% Pacific Islander, 1.19% from other races, and 1.51% from two or more races. Hispanic or Latino of any race were 2.83% of the population.

There were 5,897 households, out of which 22.8% had children under the age of 18 living with them, 39.2% were married couples living together, 12.6% had a female householder with no husband present, and 44.2% were non-families. 37.9% of all households were made up of individuals, and 11.8% had someone living alone who was 65 years of age or older. The average household size was 2.10 and the average family size was 2.77.

In the city, the population was spread out, with 20.0% under the age of 18, 11.3% from 18 to 24, 31.3% from 25 to 44, 22.0% from 45 to 64, and 15.4% who were 65 years of age or older. The median age was 36 years. For every 100 females, there were 91.1 males. For every 100 females age 18 and over, there were 87.3 males.

The median income for a household in the city was $33,848, and the median income for a family was $41,696. Males had a median income of $30,832 versus $24,708 for females. The per capita income for the city was $18,877. About 5.1% of families and 8.0% of the population were below the poverty line, including 7.9% of those under age 18 and 6.2% of those age 65 or over.

Education
Within the Red Bank city limits are Red Bank High School, Red Bank Junior High, Alpine Crest Elementary, and the Dawn School. Red Bank Elementary, while one of Red Bank's zoned schools, is outside of the city limits in Chattanooga.

Government
Red Bank has a Council-Manager form of government with five elected commissioners; District 1, District 2, District 3, and two At-Large seats. Commissioners serve staggered four year terms so that the entire commission does not turn over all at once. The five commissioners vote on city matters in public meetings, and direct the City Manager (Martin Granum), who carries out the daily affairs of the city. All subsequent city employees report to the City Manager including Public Works, the Fire Department, and the Police Department.

As of 2021, the Red Bank Board of Commissioners includes Mayor Hollie Berry (D1), Vice Mayor Stefanie Dalton (D2), Commissioner Ed LeCompte (D3), Ruth Jeno (At-Large) and Pete Phillips (At-Large). Public agenda work sessions are held at 5pm on the first and third Tuesdays of every month, followed by the board meeting at 6pm the same days. Public comments for both items on and off the agenda are welcome.

As of 2021, the Red Bank Planning Commission includes Becky Browder, Bill Cannon, Nigel Luther, Sonja Millard, and Kate Skonberg

Public planning commission meeting agenda work sessions are held the third Tuesday of every month at 12p, followed by the planning commission meeting on the third Thursday of every month at 6pm.

Mayors of Red Bank

1955–1959 Burk S. "Tom" Millard
1959–1963 J.E. Brown
1963–1965 R. Hayden Landers
1965–1971 Joe H. Godsey
1971–1973 Joe Glasscock
1973–1975 Tom H. Collins
1976–1977 Ralph Barger
1979–1981 Ralph Barger
1981–1985 Thomas R. Dodd
1983–1985 Ralph Barger
1985–1987 John Ramey
1987–1989 Ralph Barger
1989–1991 Ronnie E. Moore
1991–1993 Lester Barnette
1993–1995 Ernest E. Lewis
1995–1997 Ralph Barger
1997–1999 Pat Brown
1999-2003 Howard Daniel Cotter
1999–2007 Ronnie E. Moore
2007–2010 Joe Glasscock
2010–2012 Monty Millard
2012–2018 John Roberts
2018 - 2020 Eddie Pierce
2020 - 2020 Mayor Ruth Jeno
2020 - Current Hollie Berry

Politics

Natural Resources & Public Lands

Stringer's Branch
Stringer's Ridge
White Oak Park & Dog Park
Red Bank Community Center & Park
Kids Corner Park
Norma Cagle Ballfields
Town Center Park
Red Bank is designated as a "Bird Sanctuary"
Red Bank is home to the Tennessee State Champion Virginia Pine discovered by Don McKenzie

Notable people
 Bill Dedman, Pulitzer Prize-winning journalist and author, raised in Red Bank
 Wendell Rawls, Jr., Pulitzer Prize-winning journalist and author, raised in Red Bank
 Kane Brown, Singer

References

External links
City of Red Bank official website
City of Red Bank official Facebook page
"The City of Red Bank" – city history

Cities in Tennessee
Cities in Hamilton County, Tennessee
Cities in the Chattanooga metropolitan area
Enclaves in the United States